Patey is a surname of Anglo-Norman origin, with historical concentrations in the English counties of Devon and Berkshire, and Normandy, France.

Notable people with the surname include:

Charles George Edward Patey (1811–1881), British admiral and colonial administrator
Janet Monach Patey (1842–1894), English contralto
George Edwin Patey (1859–1935), British naval officer
Tom Patey (1932–1970), Scottish mountaineer and writer
Edward Patey (1915–2005), British clergyman
Douglas Lane Patey (born 1951), literary scholar and biographer of Evelyn Waugh
Larry Patey (born 1953), former professional ice hockey centre
William C. Patey (born c. 1954), British ambassador to Iraq
Doug Patey (born 1956), retired Canadian ice hockey player